Giannis Louloudis (born 27 March 2004) is a Greek Sneaker Collector and reseller.

Early life 

Giannis Louloudis was born to Christos Louloudis and Diamantea Chrysovalantou on 27 March 2004. Raised in Karpathos and now living in Rhodes, Greece.

Career 

In April 2021, Louloudis along with Nick Pelardis started designing their first sneaker, the 'Mpasok Lows' which are based on the logo of the Panhellenic Socialist Movement.

References 

2004 births
People from Karpathos
Living people